The  is an electric multiple unit (EMU) train type operated by the Tokyo subway operator Tokyo Metropolitan Bureau of Transportation (Toei) on the Toei Oedo Line in Tokyo, Japan.

Following testing of a two-car prototype in the late 1980s, the 12-000 series was introduced into service in December 1991. A total of 53 eight-car 12-000 series sets were built between 1990 and 2000 by Nippon Sharyo and Hitachi.

Formation

 Each M1 car is fitted with a lozenge-type pantograph.
 Car 5 is designated as a mildly-air-conditioned car.

Interior

History

Two prototype cars, numbered 12-001 and 12-002, were delivered from Tokyu Car Corporation in April 1986. These cars had stainless steel bodies and were originally built with conventional traction motors. The cars were converted to linear motor propulsion in 1987, with testing conducted on a special test track at Magome Depot. Following successful testing, it was announced in December 1988 that linear motor propulsion would be used for the new Toei Ōedo Line (then Line 12) under construction in Tokyo.

By 2001, a total of 424 vehicles would be built by Nippon Sharyo and Hitachi, formed as 53 8-car sets. The production trains featured aluminium bodies, and the first six sets were painted. 

The last remaining first-batch trains (sets 01 to 06) began withdrawal in June 2016. The final first-batch train was retired from service on 30 June 2016.

Preserved examples

The two prototype cars, 12-001 and 12-002 are preserved at Chihaya Flower Park in Toshima, Tokyo.

Gallery

References

External links

 Nippon Sharyo 12-000 series information 

Electric multiple units of Japan
Toei Subway
Train-related introductions in 1991
Hitachi multiple units

Nippon Sharyo multiple units
1500 V DC multiple units of Japan
Tokyu Car multiple units